Bhat (also spelled as Bhatt or Butt) is a surname in the Indian subcontinent. Bhat and Bhatt are shortened renditions of Bhatta.

Etymology
The word "Bhat" means "teacher" in Sanskrit. While the original shortened rendition of "Bhatta" was "Bhat" or "Bhatt," many of the Kashmiri Brahmin migrants to the Punjab region started spelling their surname as "Butt" which is the spelling of the clan used in the Punjabi language.

Geographic distribution

Goa
The surname is in use among some Konkani Christians who trace their ancestry to the Goud Saraswat Brahmins of Goa.

Kashmir
Bhat, also spelled as Bhatt or Butt, is a Kashmiri Pandit surname, found among the Kashmiri Brahmins of the Kashmir Valley, as well as Kashmiri émigrés who migrated to Punjab, a region now divided between India and the neighbouring Pakistan. Many such Kashmiris migrated to Punjab in the late 19th century due to 1878 Kashmir famine. The surname is now shared by both Kashmiri Hindus and Kashmiri Muslims who mostly retained their Hindu last names.

Punjab
Some Muslim Bhats/Butts found in Pakistani Punjab migrated to different cities of (undivided) Punjab from Kashmir and Jammu during the 1878 famine, and are Hindu converts to Islam.

Notable individuals

Academics
 Aryabhatta (476–550 CE), first of the major mathematician-astronomers from the classical age of Indian mathematics and Indian astronomy.
 Bāṇabhaṭṭa, Sanskrit prose writer and poet
 B. V. Rajarama Bhat, Indian mathematician
 Mayurbhatta, poet of harsha's court 
 Miriam Butt, Professor of Linguistics and Chair of the Department of Linguistics (Facereich Sprachwissenschaft) at the University of Konstanz
 Muhammad Asim Butt, Pakistani Urdu novelist, short story writer
 Motiram Bhatta ((1866–1896)), Nepali Sanskrit and Khas language poet
 P. Gururaja Bhat (1924–1978), Indian archaeologist
 Pamposh Bhat (born 19 September 1958), Kashmiri Indian environmentalist
 Rasheed Butt (born 1944), renowned Pakistani artist and recipient of "The Pride of Performance" 1989
 Shyam Bhat, physician
 Suresh Bhat (1932 – 2003), Marathi Indian ghazal writer
 U. Narayan Bhat (born 1934), Indian mathematician
 U. R. Bhat, economist
 Vasanti N. Bhat-Nayak, Indian mathematician
 Vinay Bhat (born 1984), American chess player
 Kiran Bhat (born 1990), Indian-American novelist

Actors, models, technicians and musicians
 Ahmed Butt (born 1975), male Pakistani model and actor
 Ali Azmat Butt (born 20 April 1970), Pakistani rock artist, and former lead singer of rock band Junoon
 Alia Bhatt (born 15 March 1993), Bollywood actress
 Ambreen Butt, Pakistani model
 Anuradha Bhat (born 1969), Indian playback singer
 Asha Bhat (born 1992), Indian model
 Asim Butt (born 1978), Pakistani painter and sculptor and a member of the Stuckist Art Movement
 Biraj Bhatta, Nepalese actor
 DJ Butt (born 1987), Pakistani disc jockey for PTI
 Farhan Saeed Butt (born 1984), Pakistani singer and member of rock band Jal
 Imran Imtiaz Butt, Pakistani singer
 Ganapati Bhat, Hindustani classical vocalist
 Hrishitaa Bhatt, Indian model
 Keerthi Bhat (born 1999), Indian actress
 Mahesh Bhatt (born 1948), Indian film producer and director
 Muhammad Younis Butt (born 1962), Pakistani screenwriter
 Neil Bhatt, Indian Television actor, dancer, choreographer 
 Osman Khalid Butt (born 1986), Pakistani actor
 Pooja Bhatt (born 1972), Indian actress
 Praneet Bhat, Kashmiri Indian actor
 Rabia Butt, Pakistani model
 Rahul Bhat, Kashmiri Indian actor
 Ramesh Bhat, Indian actor
 Samina Peerzada Butt, Pakistani actress
 Tanmay Bhat, Indian actor and Comedian
 Yogaraj Bhat (born 1972), Indian film writer and director.

Businesspeople
 Baiju Bhatt (born 1984/1985), American billionaire, co-founder of Robinhood

Military
 Muhammad Zaki Butt (26 January 1929), former Air Commodore in the Pakistan Air Force and bodyguard of Quaid-e-Azam, Muhammad Ali Jinnah
 Ziauddin Butt, former Chief of the Inter-Services Intelligence
 Tahir Rafique Butt (born 1955), 20th Chief of Air Staff of the Pakistan Air Force
 Malik Tazi Bhat, 15th-century Warlord, from Jammu, who fought Lodhi Dynasty

Politics
 Balaji Vishwanath Bhat (born 1662), Peshwa of the Maratha Empire
 Baji Rao I (born 1700), Peshwa of the Maratha Empire
 Ghulam Mustafa Bhat, former Mayor of Srinagar
 Hassan Butt (born  1980), the former spokesman for the disbanded British Islamist group Al-Muhajiroun
 Kalsoom Nawaz Sharif, First Lady of Pakistan, wife of Prime Minister Nawaz Sharif, of Kashmiri origin
 Khemraj Bhatta "Mayalu", Nepali Congress politician
 Lekh Raj Bhatta, Nepali CPN Maoist politician
 Masarat Alam Bhat (born 1971), Kashmiri separatist
 Maqbool Bhat (18 February 1938 – 11 February 1984), executed Kashmiri separatist
 Shakeel Bhat (born around 1978), outspoken Kashmiri separatist activist, labeled as an "Islamic Rage Boy" by Western media
 S. L. Bhat, Kashmiri Indian serving as the Chairman of the Jammu & Kashmir Public Service Commission
 Sohail Shaukat Butt (born 1 April 1983), Pakistani politician
 Trilochan Bhatta (born 1969), Nepalese politician and current Chief Minister of Sudurpashchim Province, Nepal
 Umer Tanveer Butt (born 6 March 1982) a young politician and Member of the Punjab Provincial Assembly, businessman, and philanthropist

Scientists
 Noor Muhammad Butt(born on 3 June 1936), Pakistani nuclear physicist, research scientist, and chairman of the Pakistan Science Foundation
 Parvez Butt (born on 4 October 1942), Pakistani nuclear engineer and former chairman of the Pakistan Atomic Energy Commission
 Atul Butte, a researcher in biomedical informatics and biotechnology entrepreneur in Silicon Valley

Sports
Amad Butt (born 10 May 1995), Pakistani cricket player for Islamabad United, of Kashmiri origin
Arif Butt ( May 17, 1944 – July 11, 2007), Pakistani cricket player
Arvind Bhat (born 7 June 1979), Indian badminton player
Abhishek Bhat (born 19 November 1989), Indian cricket player
Ghulam Mohammad Baksh Butt (22 May 1878 – 23 May 1960), a wrestler is also known popularly as The Great Gama of Kashmiri Brahman origin.
Hussain Butt (born 7 August 1976), Pakistani cricketer
Ijaz Butt (born 10 March 1938), former Chairman of Pakistan Cricket Board and cricket player, of Kashmiri origin
Ikram Butt (born 25 October 1968), Rugby player for England, of Pakistani/Kashmiri origin
Muhammad Sharif Butt (15 January 1926 – 8 June 2015), Pakistani sprinter
Pramila Bhatt (born 16 September 1969), Indian cricketer
Raghuram Bhat (born 16 April 1958), Indian cricketer
Rehan Butt (6 July 1980), Pakistani field hockey player
Samad Bhat (born 2 October 1995), Indian cricket player
Salman Butt (born 7 October 1984), Pakistani cricketer
Sadia Butt (born 2 March 1975), Pakistani cricketer
Shujauddin Butt (10 April 1930 – 7 February 2006), Pakistani cricketer
Yasir Butt ((born 3 July 1986), Pakistani squash player
Yousuf Butt (born  October 18, 1989), Pakistani footballer

See also

 Barot (caste)
 Bhatia
 Bhattacharyya
 Bhati

References

Brahmin communities
Ethnic groups in India
Indian castes
Indian surnames
Social groups of Pakistan
Mulla Brahmins
Surnames
Brahmin communities of Uttarakhand
Kashmiri-language surnames
Kashmiri tribes